Percy Wyfold Stout DSO, OBE (20 November 1875 – 9 October 1937) was an English international rugby union wing who played club rugby for Gloucester and Richmond. Stout also played international rugby for England, playing five matches between 1898 and 1899.

Sporting career
Stout was born in Gloucester, England, in 1875, the son of rower William Stout. His father gave several of his sons middle names connected to rowing, and Stout was no exception with his being taken from the Wyfold Challenge Cup. Stout was educated at Crypt Grammar School, where he took up association football.

Several of Stout's brothers were high-profile sportsmen, and he followed younger brother Frank in joining association football team Gloucester City. While playing for Gloucester, Stout suggested the formation of a Bristol and District League, which was set up in 1892. Stout is also reported to have played for Wickwar and Corinthian F.C. before switching to rugby union in 1895.

Stout would spend the greater part of his rugby career with Gloucester, along with his brother Frank. Stout also played at county level for Gloucestershire. During the 1897–1898 season he was selected for invitational touring team the Barbarians, and that year he was also offered a place in the England national team. His first international match was in the 1898 Home Nations Championship, an away game at Edinburgh against Scotland. The match saw Stout join his brother Frank in the team, an England international since 1896. The game ended in a three all draw. Percy played in one more game in the 1898 series, a win over Wales. Stout scored his only international try in that match, a game which also saw Frank score a try. This was the first time that brothers had both scored international tries in the same game for England. The next time this feat was achieved was in the 1993 Five Nations Championship by Rory and Tony Underwood.

Stout played in three more games for England, all in the 1899 Home Nations Championship. Stout was taken from the wing and placed at centre in each of the games of the Championship. It was a torrid season for England, losing each of the games to come bottom of the table. Stout was never selected for England again, and in 1900 he left Gloucester, playing for Richmond F.C. and Bristol before retiring from rugby.

Later life and military career
With his rugby career over, Stout moved to Cairo where he became a stockbroker. Initially in a partnership with Hogg, Stout bought up his partner's share when he died in 1907. He and his American wife, Mary, settled in Maadi in 1910, becoming one of the earliest settlers to the region. With the outbreak of the First World War, Stout joined the British Army and was given a position on the Machine Gun Corps and saw action in Egypt and Gaza. He was mentioned in despatches on five occasions, and as a member of the Motor Machine Gun Service he was awarded the Distinguished Service Order in 1917. His citation in the London Gazette on 16 August 1917 read as:

With the end of the war, Stout returned to Egypt as a civilian. He became a director of the Egyptian Delta Land Co and the Anglo American Nile whilst in Cairo. He was awarded the OBE by the British government and also received the Order of the Nile (4th Class). He died in London in 1937.

References

External links
 Percy Stout Gloucester Rugby profile

1875 births
1937 deaths
Association footballers not categorized by position
Barbarian F.C. players
British Army personnel of World War I
Companions of the Distinguished Service Order
England international rugby union players
English footballers
English rugby union players
Gloucester City A.F.C. players
Gloucester Rugby players
Gloucestershire County RFU players
Machine Gun Corps officers
Officers of the Order of the British Empire
People educated at The Crypt School, Gloucester
Richmond F.C. players
Military personnel from Gloucestershire
Rugby union centres
Rugby union players from Gloucester
Rugby union wings
Motor Machine Gun Service officers